The Battle of Hearts is a 1916 American silent drama film written and directed by Oscar Apfel, and produced and distributed by Fox Film Corporation. It starred William Farnum and Elda Furry (later known as Hedda Hopper). The story was written by Frances Marion, then still an actress herself. This was Hopper's first motion picture.

Most of the film is lost. Hopper screened small portions of it in 1942 in her self-produced short series Hedda Hopper's Hollywood. It is unknown if she had a complete print of this film at the time. These portions can be seen today in her 1942 short and are the only known surviving footage from the film.

Cast
 William Farnum as Martin Cane
 Hedda Hopper as Maida Rhodes (credited as Elda Furry)
 Wheeler Oakman as Jo Sprague
 William Burress as Captain Sprague
 Willard Louis as Captain Rhodes

See also
1937 Fox vault fire
List of lost films
List of Fox Film films

References

External links

 
 

1916 films
1916 drama films
Fox Film films
Silent American drama films
American silent feature films
American black-and-white films
Films based on short fiction
Films directed by Oscar Apfel
Lost American films
1916 lost films
Lost drama films
1910s American films
1910s English-language films